{{DISPLAYTITLE:C28H40O7}}
The molecular formula C28H40O7 (molar mass: 488.61 g/mol, exact mass: 488.2774 u) may refer to:

 Amebucort, a synthetic glucocorticoid corticosteroid
 Hydrocortisone buteprate, a topical steroid